Doctor's Daughters is a British comedy television series which originally aired on ITV in 1981. It was written by Richard Gordon, the creator of the Doctor novel and television series set in medical institutions. In this case, three older doctors are thrown out when they are replaced in their practice by three attractive young female doctors.

Cast

Main
 Victoria Burgoyne as Dr Fay Liston 
 Lesley Duff as Dr. Lucy Drake
 Norman Chappell as  Mr. Windows
 Bridget Armstrong as  Liz Arkdale
 Bill Fraser as Dr. Freddie Fellows-Smith
 Richard Murdoch as  Dr. 'Biggin' Hill
 Jack Watling as  Dr. Roland Carmichael

Other
Other actors who appeared in individual episodes of the series include Nigel Planer, Georgina Moon, Jimmy Logan, Edward Hibbert, Julian Fellowes, Harold Goodwin and Patrick Newell.

References

Bibliography
 Walker, Craig. On The Buses: The Complete Story. Andrews UK Limited, 2011.

External links
 

1981 British television series debuts
1981 British television series endings
1980s British comedy television series
ITV sitcoms
English-language television shows
Television shows produced by Associated Television (ATV)